European route E28 is a west-east intermediate road in the international E-road network. The section between Kaliningrad and Minsk is part of the Pan-European Corridor IX.

History 
In the 1975-version of E-roads, the predecessor of this road was the E26 (and current E26 was called E28) going from Berlin to Gdańsk. It changed its name when it still was this short. This was not signposted, as signposting was delayed until the modified version was released, in which the road was called E28.

In the 1950-version of E-roads, signposted until after 1980, the road Berlin-Szczecin was the E74, while Szczecin-Minsk was not an E-road.

Route 
Germany
 : Berlin - Prenzlau - Pomellen border crossing
Poland
 : Kołbaskowo - Szczecin
 : Szczecin - Goleniów - Koszalin - Słupsk - Gdańsk
 : Gdańsk - Elbląg
 : (Berlinka) Elbląg - Grzechotki border crossing

Russia
 27A-021: Mamonovo II - Kaliningrad
 27A-008: within Kaliningrad
 : Kaliningrad - Nesterov - Chernyshevskoye border crossing

Lithuania
 : Kybartai - Marijampolė
 : Marijampolė - Prienai - Vilnius
 : Vilnius - Medininkai border crossing

Belarus
 : to Minsk

References

External links 
 UN Economic Commission for Europe: Overall Map of E-road Network (2007)

28
E028
E028
E028
E28
E028
E028